Hundred Reasons are an English alternative rock band from Aldershot, Hampshire, and Teddington, South West London, formed in 1999. The band consists of Colin Doran (vocals), Larry Hibbitt (guitar, vocals), Andy Gilmour (bass) and Andy Bews (drums).

Having toured almost constantly for 14 months throughout the UK and Europe in support of their first releases EP1 (Cerebra), EP2 (Remmus) and EP3, (I'll Find You), Hundred Reasons released their debut album, Ideas Above Our Station (2002), to critical acclaim and commercial success. The album yielded the singles, "I'll find you", "If I Could", "Silver" and "Falter", and was followed by Shatterproof Is Not a Challenge in 2004. After being dropped by Columbia Records, the band signed with V2 Records and released their third studio album, Kill Your Own (2006). Guitarist and vocalist Paul Townsend departed from the band following its release, and was replaced by Ben Doyle for the band's fourth studio album, Quick the Word, Sharp the Action (2007).

Following years of inactivity, the band played 10th anniversary shows to celebrate the release of Ideas Above Our Station in 2012, and briefly reunited again for two shows in the summer of 2014. Between 2017 and 2019, Doran and Gilmour performed the band's material as an acoustic duo, named Undead Raisins, leading to a full band reunion announcement in 2021. The band released its fifth studio album, Glorious Sunset in February 2023.

Hundred Reasons have had 6 top 40 hit singles, 2 top 20 hit albums, and have been nominated for several Awards, winning three Kerrang! awards for: "Best New Band" (2000), "Best Album" (2002) and "Best Unsigned Act" (2004).

Career

Floor and early HR demos
(1998-2000)

The band were known as Floor for a couple of years prior and started out with the majority of its members sans Larry, who was in fellow local band Jetpak. When Larry left Jetpak and joined the band, Hundred Reasons were born. There were a couple of 2 track Floor demos available at gigs around the late 1990's. One of which contained 'Floored' (later re-recorded for the EPOne release and renamed 'Clear (Flawed)') and 'Seated Near'. The second demo featured 'Wireframe' and 'Different' (these later appeared on the Commercial Breakdown compilation CD in 2000). There was also a full length studio recording of 10 Floor tracks from early 2000 which was known as 'Original Floor Demo' on Gravity DIP. Tracks included: 'Different', 'Wireframe', 'Floored', 'Seated Near', 'Slow Learner', 'Demise', 'Counting The Days', 'Sober', 'Reasons To Return' and 'Change Of Seasons' (re-recorded later as a B-side for 'The Great Test' single).

EP1, EP2 and EP3
(2000-2001)

The band had already built up a good live reputation by early 2000 and had caught the attention of Fierce Panda Records, EP1 was released on Fierce Panda in July 2000, in support of this, the band toured for much of the rest of the year, including an NME tour with Idlewild. They went on to claim their first award, Best New Band at the Kerrang awards in London.

In early 2001 the band signed with Columbia Records and immediately entered the studio to record EP2. It was released in May 2001 followed by UK and European tours with Incubus and Muse. The band would finish the year with the release of EP3 and their first headline tour of the UK.

Ideas Above Our Station and Shatterproof is Not a Challenge (2002–2004)

The band's debut album, Ideas Above Our Station was recorded at Magic Shop Studio, New York City in August and September 2001 and was released on 20 May 2002. it peaked at No. 6 in the UK Albums Chart has achieved Gold status with sales of over 118,000 copies and spawned several Top 40 hits in the UK Singles Chart. The band went on to tour extensively throughout Europe and Japan, ending the album tour with their first and only US show at SXSW music festival. This time period represents the heights of the band's success. They made over 50 festival appearances during 2002, 2003 and 2004, headlining many stages including the Radio 1 stage at Ozzfest, Donnington. They also made many TV appearances, including two performances on the legendary Top of the Pops in the UK. 
They won the award for Best Album at the Kerrang awards in August 2002. The winter headline tour of the UK would see them playing the biggest shows of their career, ending at the London Brixton Academy.

In early spring of 2003 the band relocated to Cornwall UK for a few months to finish writing their second album. Recording the Album took place in June and July, with the band again opting for Magic Shop Studio in New York City. Shatterproof Is Not A Challenge was released on 1 March 2004. The band headed out on a headline tour of the UK and a European arena tour with good friends Incubus.  Despite successful tours and reaching Silver status with sales of more than 65,000 copies within 4 months of its release, the touring was cut short when they were dropped by Sony BMG in June 2004. Colin Doran has said "Our relationship soured with Sony when the MD left the company as he was the reason that we signed in the first place. We felt that decisions made after that event were impacting the band in a negative way, the support and drive was no longer there, so we were happy to leave the label and were banking on it." The band would make a Main stage appearance at Reading and Leeds Festival in August with a back drop that read 'For Sale'

Kill Your Own and Townsend's departure (2005–2006)

Hundred Reasons signed to V2 Records in September 2005, having spent the best part of the year writing under a train arch in south London, the band entered Kore studios in London to record their third album. Kill Your Own - produced by guitarist Larry Hibbitt - was released on 20 March 2006. It was very well received by fans and critics alike. The band headed out on headline tours throughout Europe and Japan, they also toured with Jimmy Eat World and New Found Glory and made many festival appearances around Europe.  They finished up the album campaign with a U.K. tour, culminating with a sold-out show at the London Koko

On 9 August 2006, it was announced on the band's official website that guitarist and vocalist Paul Townsend would be leaving the band following their tour of Japan in early September. Townsend's departure was said to be 'totally amicable', and Ben Doyle of The Lucky Nine joined the band as his replacement.

Quick the Word, Sharp the Action (2007–2009)

The band's fourth album Quick the Word, Sharp the Action, was recorded in February 2007 and released on 15 October 2007. The band again embarked on tours of Europe and Japan. However, less than a month after the album's release, V2 Records was purchased by Universal Records - leaving the band without a record label, the band describing the situation as: "depressingly similar to when Shatterproof was released in 2004. Lightning has struck, hard. Twice..  " Larry Hibbitt joked in interview that "if you count publishing, we have now had more record labels than albums."

In 2009, the band embarked on a short tour supporting a "re-mastered, re-sequenced and almost re-packaged" version of Quick the Word, Sharp the Action before becoming inactive for several years.

Hiatus, Ideas Above Our Station anniversary shows, and Undead Raisins (2009–2021)
Reflecting on the band's extended hiatus, Colin Doran noted: "After Quick The Word, personally for me that felt like it was going to be it. I’m quite pragmatic and I think it had some good songs on it, but it wasn’t what I would call our best record. Things were on a bit of a downward turn, to be open and frank about it. We just ended up, not necessarily dissolving the band but everybody had to go and find other things to do. Those things took over, then weeks turned into months, which turned into years. Larry was building his career as a producer, I was in education and doing stuff like that, Bews was living in America which made rehearsal quite different, and Andy was in another band at the time called Freeze Atlantic."

In early 2012, the band posted a photograph online featuring founding guitarist Paul Townsend amongst its line-up, with a caption reading, "6 years later..." It was later confirmed that Townsend had rejoined Hundred Reasons and that the band were "immensely super-pleased about this." Regarding the band's return, guitarist Larry Hibbitt noted, "We sort of fizzled out a little bit and never went out with a bang or split up. We’ve been talking about trying to get together to try and mark the anniversary – it’s not even a reunion, it’s not a comeback, I don’t know what it is!"

In April 2012, the band announced that they would be performing at both Banquet Records Big Day Out and 2000Trees, and that the overall number of anniversary shows would be limited due to the availability of each band member. Hell is for Heroes drummer Joe Birch would be performing with the band in the summer, due to drummer Andy Bews' prior commitments, with the band stating, "In the winter, there’ll be a special thing with Bewsy and then that will be it for the foreseeable future."

On 8 May, the band revealed that guitarist Paul Townsend would no longer be performing with the band at 2000Trees or Big Day Out.

In November 2012 the band played their Ideas Above Our Station 10th anniversary shows, starting with a warm up show at the Exeter Cavern club. They then went on to play three sold-out shows at the London Coronet, Manchester Academy and London Forum, and reunited again in 2014 for Sonisphere Festival.

On 19 and 20 November 2017, Colin Doran and Andy Gilmour performed acoustic sets at Koko in London as the support act to My Vitriol. Naming themselves the Undead Raisins, the pair went continued to perform acoustic versions of Hundred Reasons songs in the Summer of 2018 at Notting Hill Arts Club, the Summer Westival and 2000 Trees.

Glorious Sunset (2022–present)
On October 25, 2022 the band announced in a surprise email to fans that they would be releasing their first new music in fifteen years, with a single called "Glorious Sunset". A full-length album, Glorious Sunset, will be released on February 24, 2023, with the band noting: "The reason we don’t play all the time is that it has to feel like there’s a purpose for it. The surprising thing was that when we all got in a room together and started writing songs it all happened very quickly. It was probably the most natural writing process that we’d had since writing our first record, which gave me quite a lot of enthusiasm for it that I didn’t think was going to be there!"
 
The band went on to headline a six-date UK tour in February and March 2023 with support from Hell is for Heroes and My Vitriol, culminating at The Eventim Hammersmith Apollo in London.

Members
Current
Colin Doran – lead vocals (1999–2012; 2014; 2021–present)
Larry Hibbitt – guitar, occasional lead vocals (1999–2012; 2014; 2021–present)
Andy Gilmour – bass (1999–2012; 2014; 2021–present)
Andy Bews – drums (1999–2012; 2021–present)

Former
Paul Townsend – guitar, occasional lead vocals (1999–2006, 2012)
Ben Doyle – guitar (2006–2009)

Touring musicians
Curtis Mead - bass (UK, 2008)
Joe Birch – drums (festival appearances, 2012, 2014)
Cal Owen – guitar (all shows, 2012, 2014)

Timeline

Discography

Studio albums

Live albums

Extended plays

Singles Chart

Promotional Singles

Music videos

Compilation albums
The Dead Cheap Fierce Panda Sampler - (September 2000, features "Cerebra")
Born To Do It Better - (October 2000, features "Change Of Season")
Rumours, Ridicule and the Profit Motive - (January 2001, features "Counting The Days")
Please Take Off Your Shoes Before Entering - (March 2001, features "Slow Learner")
Rumours, Ridicule and the Profit Motive - (April 2001, features "Counting The Days")
Commercial Breakdown Vol. 2 - (August 2001, features "Different" and "Wireframe")
Mosh & Go - (October 2001, features "Slow Learner")
Oli Coles 'appy Days - (March 2012, features "falter")
How Soon Is Now - The Songs of the Smiths - (March 2004, features their cover of "How Soon Is Now?")

References

External links

What You Get - Hundred Reasons fansite
Video for "No Way Back" - director: Shane Davey

Interviews
Stereokill Interview: Andy Gilmour, April 2009
Interview with Larry Hibbitt
January 2008 Liberation Frequency interview with Larry Hibbitt
Article on Hundred Reasons

British post-grunge groups
Musical groups established in 1999
English alternative rock groups
Kerrang! Awards winners
British post-hardcore musical groups
1999 establishments in England
Musical groups reestablished in 2021
Musical groups disestablished in 2019